Maravarman Vikkiraman II  was a Pandyan king, who ruled regions of South India between 1250–1251 CE.

Shared rule 

Maravarman Vikkiraman II was one of many Pandyan princes who ruled the Pandyan kingdom in the mid-13th Century. The practice of shared rule with one prince asserting primacy was common in the Pandyan Kingdom. The other princes of the Pandyan royal family with whom he shared his rule were  Jatavarman Sundara Pandyan I and Jatavarman Veera Pandyan I

End of Hoysala Hegemony 

His rule marked the end of more than two decades of Hoysala influence over the Pandya kingdom. His meikeerthi declares that he was like a lion to the Hoysala elephant.

Notes

References

 
 
 

Pandyan kings
Tamil history
Year of death unknown
Year of birth unknown
13th-century Indian monarchs
13th-century Hindus